Galaxy Futsal Club is an Australian futsal club based in Gold Coast, Queensland. They play in the F-League which is the top tier of Australian Futsal. Galaxy FC was founded in late 2014 by Armando Cacace and Andrew Parkes.

History 
Galaxy FC is a founded entity that will compete in the FFA F- League. Galaxy FC is a representative based club which has amalgamated four of the elite clubs in the QLD and NSW Regions. - Gold Coast Futsal - Just Futsal NSW - Brisbane Magic Futsal - Bundaberg Futsal The four existing and well established clubs have pooled both talent and resources in order to form a new Futsal F League club.

Notable players 
 Roger Cua (Australia Futsalroos representative)
 Lucas Osorio Silva (New Zealand Futsal Whites representative)
 James Egeta (Solomon Islands Kurukuru representative)
 Renagi Ingram (Australia Futsalroos representative)

Notable Coaches 

Bruno Cannavan (Brazilian Coach - one of the most successful coaches in Australia) 2015-2018
Vinicius Leite (Brazilian Coach - Current Solomon Islands National Team Coach) 2019-

Current squad

Club Honours

Regional competitions 

 SEQ Premier League: 3 (2017, 2018, 2019)
 Qld Superliga Draft League: 1 (2020)
 Victorian State Futsal Championships: 4 (2016, 2017, 2018, 2019)

National competitions 

 F-League: 2 (2015, 2016)

International competitions 

 Craig Foster International: 4 (2015, 2016, 2017, 2018)
 Gold Coast International: 2 (2019, 2020)
 Lismore International Cup: 4 (2015, 2016, 2017, 2018)
 New Zealand Futsal Nationals: 3 (2016, 2017, 2018,)
 World Futsal Championship | Barcelona, Spain: 3 (2016, 2017, 2018,)
 Kobe Futsal Festival | Osaka, Japan: 1 (2017)
 World Club Futsal Championship | Orlando, USA: 3 (2016, 2017, 2018,)

Coaching staff

References

External links 
 F-League official website
 Official website

2014 establishments in Australia
Futsal clubs established in 2014
Futsal clubs in Australia
Sports teams in Queensland
Sporting teams based on the Gold Coast, Queensland